HMS Canterbury was a 60-gun fourth-rate ship of the line of the Royal Navy, launched at Deptford on 18 December 1693.

She was rebuilt at Portsmouth according to the 1719 Establishment, and was relaunched on 15 September 1722.

Canterbury along with HMS Chester, during the War of Jenkins' Ear captured the Spanish Caracca St Joseph on 23 September 1739. The St.Joseph was probably the most valuable single prize of the war.

On 25 April 1741, she was ordered to be taken to pieces and rebuilt at Plymouth Dockyard as a 58-gun fourth rate according to the 1741 proposals of the 1719 Establishment. She was relaunched on 5 February 1744.

Canterbury was placed on harbour service in 1761, and was broken up in 1770.

Notes

References

 Lavery, Brian (2003) The Ship of the Line – Volume 1: The development of the battlefleet 1650–1850. Conway Maritime Press. .

External links
 

Ships of the line of the Royal Navy
1690s ships